Daniel Le Hirbec (1621–1647) was a French navigator and compatriot of François Pyrard de Laval.

References 

1621 births
1647 deaths
French sailors
People from Mayenne